This is the discography documenting albums and singles released by American singer Luther Vandross. Vandross has sold approximately 40 million records worldwide.

Albums

Studio albums

Compilation albums

Holiday albums

Live albums

Singles

As lead artist
{| class="wikitable plainrowheaders" style="text-align:center;"
|-
! scope="col" rowspan="2" style="width:1em;"| Year
! scope="col" rowspan="2" style="width:20em;"| Title
! scope="col" colspan="5"| US chart peaks
! scope="col" colspan="5"| International chart peaks
! scope="col" rowspan="2"| Certifications 
! scope="col" rowspan="2"| Album
|-
! scope="col" style="width:3em;font-size:85%;"| Hot 100
! scope="col" style="width:3em;font-size:85%;"| Adult Con.
! scope="col" style="width:3em;font-size:85%;"| Club Play
! scope="col" style="width:3em;font-size:85%;"| Dance Sales
! scope="col" style="width:3em;font-size:85%;"| R&B HipHop
! scope="col" style="width:3em;font-size:85%;"| CAN
! scope="col" style="width:3em;font-size:85%;"| GER
! scope="col" style="width:3em;font-size:85%;"| IRE
! scope="col" style="width:3em;font-size:85%;"| NZ
! scope="col" style="width:3em;font-size:85%;"| UK
|-
| rowspan="2"| 1981
! scope="row"| "Never Too Much"
| 33 || — || 4 || 35 || 1 || — || — || 18 || 47 || 13 
|
 RIAA: Platinum
 BPI: Platinum
| rowspan="3"| Never Too Much
|-
! scope="row"| "Don't You Know That?"
| 107 || — || — || — || 10 || — || — || — || — || —
|
|-
| rowspan="3"| 1982
! scope="row"| "Sugar and Spice (I Found Me a Girl)" 
| — || — || — || — || 72 || — || — || — || — || —
|
|-
! scope="row"| "If This World Were Mine" (with Cheryl Lynn)
| 101 || — || — || — || 4 || — || — || — || — || —
|
| [[The Best of Luther Vandross... The Best of Love|The Best of Love]]|-
! scope="row"| "Bad Boy"/"Having a Party" (Medley)
| 55 || — || — || — || 3 || — || — || — || — || —
|
| rowspan="4"| Forever, for Always, for Love|-
| rowspan="5"| 1983
! scope="row"| "Since I Lost My Baby"
| — || — || — || — || 17 || — || — || — || — || —
|
|-
! scope="row"| "You're the Sweetest One"
| — || — || — || — || — || — || — || — || — || —
|
|-
! scope="row"| "Promise Me"
| — || — || — || — || 72 || — || — || — || — || —
|
|-
! scope="row"| "How Many Times Can We Say Goodbye" (with Dionne Warwick)
| 27 || 4 || — || — || 7 || — || — || — || — || 99
|
| rowspan="5"| Busy Body|-
! scope="row"| "I'll Let You Slide" 
| 102 || — || — || — || 9 || — || — || — || — || 100
|
|-
| rowspan="3"| 1984
! scope="row"| "Superstar"/"Until You Come Back to Me(That's What I'm Gonna Do)" (Medley)
| 87 || — || — || — || 5 || — || — || — || — || —
|
|-
! scope="row"| "Make Me a Believer" 
| — || — || — || — || 48 || — || — || — || — || —
|
|-
! scope="row"| "I Wanted Your Love" 
| — || — || — || — || — || — || — || — || — || 88
|
|-
| rowspan="3"| 1985
! scope="row"| "Til My Baby Comes Home" 
| 29 || — || — || 10 || 4 || — || — || — || 26 || —
|
| rowspan="4"| The Night I Fell in Love|-
! scope="row"| "It's Over Now" 
| 101 || — || 36 || 46 || 4 || — || — || — || — || —
|
|-
! scope="row"| "Wait for Love" 
| — || — || — || — || 11 || — || — || — || — || —
|
|-
| rowspan="3"| 1986
! scope="row"| "If Only for One Night" 
| — || — || — || — || 59 || — || — || — || — || —
|
|-
! scope="row"| "Give Me the Reason" 
| 57 || — || — || — || 3 || — || — || — || — || 26
|
| rowspan="7"| Give Me the Reason|-
! scope="row"| "Stop to Love" 
| 15 || 7 || 27 || 15 || 1 || 91 || — || — || — || 24 
|
|-
| rowspan="4"| 1987
! scope="row"| "There's Nothing Better Than Love" (with Gregory Hines)
| 50 || 20 || — || — || 1 || — || — || — || — || 72 
|
|-
! scope="row"| "I Really Didn't Mean It" 
| — || — || — || — || 6 || — || — || 24 || — || 16 
|
|-
! scope="row"| "So Amazing"
| — || — || — || — || 94 || — || — || — || — || 33
|
|-
! scope="row"| "See Me" 
| — || — || — || — || — || — || — || — || — || 60
|
|-
| rowspan="3"| 1988
! scope="row"| "I Gave It Up (When I Fell in Love)" 
| — || — || — || — || — || — || — || — || — || 28
|
|-
! scope="row"| "Any Love" 
| 44 || 12 || — || — || 1 || — || — || 26 || 26 || 31 
|
| rowspan="4"| Any Love|-
! scope="row"| "She Won't Talk to Me" 
| 30 || 17 || 18 || — || 3 || — || — || — || 17 || 34 
|
|-
| rowspan="3"| 1989
! scope="row"| "For You to Love"
| — || — || — || — || 3 || — || — || — || — || —
|
|-
! scope="row"| "Come Back" 
| — || — || — || — || — || — || — || — || — || 53
|
|-
! scope="row"| "Here and Now" 
| 6 || 3 || — || — || 1 || 54 || — || — || — || 43 
|
 RIAA: Platinum
| rowspan="2"| Luther Vandross...The Best of Love|-
| 1990
! scope="row"| "Treat You Right" 
| — || — || — || — || 5 || — || — || — || — || 92
|
|-
| rowspan="3"| 1991
! scope="row"| "Power of Love/Love Power" 
| 4 || 3 || — || 11 || 1 || 8 || — || — || 45 || 46 
|
| rowspan="4"| Power of Love|-
! scope="row"| "Don't Want to Be a Fool" 
| 9 || 5 || — || — || 4 || 42 || — || — || — || — 
|
|-
! scope="row"| "The Rush" 
| 73 || — || — || 44 || 6 || — || — || — || — || 53 
|
|-
| rowspan="2"| 1992
! scope="row"| "Sometimes It's Only Love"
| — || 9 || — || — || 9 || — || — || — || — || —
|
|-
! scope="row"| "The Best Things in Life Are Free" (with Janet Jackson, BBD and Ralph Tresvant)
| 10 || — || 3 || 39 || 1 || 8 || 8 || 6 || 6 || 2 
|
 BPI: Silver
| Mo' Money(Mo' Money Soundtrack)
|-
| rowspan="4"| 1993
! scope="row"| "Little Miracles (Happen Every Day)" 
| 62 || 30 || — || — || 10 || — || — || — || — || 28 
|
| rowspan="4"| Never Let Me Go|-
! scope="row"| "Heaven Knows" 
| 94 || — || 15 || 39 || 24 || 89 || 69 || — || — || 34 
|
|-
! scope="row"| "Never Let Me Go"
| — || — || — || — || 31 || — || — || — || — || —
|
|-
! scope="row"| "Love Is on the Way" 
| — || — || — || — || — || — || — || — || — || 38
|
|-
| rowspan="2"| 1994
! scope="row"| "Endless Love" (with Mariah Carey)
| 2 || 11 || — || 25 || 7 || 6 || 14 || 4 || 1 || 3 
|
RIAA: Gold
 RIANZ: Platinum
 BPI: Silver
| rowspan="5"| Songs|-
! scope="row"| "Always and Forever" 
| 58 || 25 || — || — || 16 || 74 || — || — || — || 20
|
|-
| rowspan="4"| 1995
! scope="row"| "Love the One You're With" 
| rowspan="2"| 95 || 33 || — || — 
| rowspan="2"| 28 || 49 || 53 || — || 23 || 31
|
|-
! scope="row"| "Going in Circles" 
| — || — || — || — || — || — || — || —
|
|-
! scope="row"| "Ain't No Stoppin' Us Now"
| — || — || — || — || — || — || 82 || — || 50 || 22
|
|-
! scope="row"| "Every Year, Every Christmas" 
| — || — || — || — || — || — || — || — || — || 43
|
| This Is Christmas|-
| rowspan="2"| 1996
! scope="row"| "Your Secret Love"
| 52 || — || — || — || 5 || — || — || — || — || 14
|
| rowspan="2"| Your Secret Love|-
! scope="row"| "I Can Make It Better"
| 80 || — || — || — || 15 || — || — || — || — || 44
|
|-
| 1997
! scope="row"| "I Won't Let You Do That to Me" 
| — || — || — || — || — || — || — || — || — || —
|
| rowspan="2"| One Night with You: The Best of Love, Volume 2|-
| rowspan="3"| 1998
! scope="row"| "When You Call on Me/Baby That's When I Come Runnin'" 
| — || — || — || — || — || — || — || — || — || —
|
|-
! scope="row"| "Nights in Harlem" (with Precise)
| — || — || — || — || 29 || — || — || — || — || —
|
| rowspan="4"| I Know|-
! scope="row"| "I Know" (with Stevie Wonder)
| — || — || — || — || 61 || — || — || — || — || —
|
|-
| rowspan="2"| 1999
! scope="row"| "I'm Only Human" (with Cassandra Wilson & Bob James)
| — || — || — || — || 57 || — || — || — || — || —
|
|-
! scope="row"| "Are You Using Me?" 
| — || — || 46 || — || — || — || — || — || — || —
|
|-
| rowspan="2"| 2001
! scope="row"| "Take You Out"
| 26 || — || — || — || 7 || — || — || — || — || 59
|
| rowspan="3"| Luther Vandross|-
! scope="row"| "Can Heaven Wait"
| — || — || 3 || — || 63 || — || — || — || — || —
|
|-
| 2002
! scope="row"| "I'd Rather" 
| 83 || 17 || — || — || 40 || — || — || — || — || —
|
|-
| rowspan="2"| 2003
! scope="row"| "Dance with My Father" 
| 38 || 4 || — || — || 28 || — || — || 4 || — || 21 
|
 RIAA: Platinum
 BPI: Gold
| rowspan="4"| Dance with My Father|-
! scope="row"| "Think About You" 
| 103 || — || — || — || 29 || — || — || — || — || —
|
|-
| rowspan="2"| 2004
! scope="row"| "Buy Me a Rose" 
| — || 13 || — || — || — || — || — || — || — || —
|
|-
! scope="row"| "The Closer I Get to You" (with Beyoncé)
| — || — || — || — || 62 || — || — || — || — || —
|
|-
| rowspan="2"| 2006
! scope="row"| "Shine" 
| 116 || — || 10 || — || 31 || — || — || — || — || 50
|
| rowspan="2"| The UltimateLuther Vandross|-
! scope="row"| "Got You Home"
| — || — || — || — || 53 || — || — || — || — || —
|
|-
| align="center" colspan="15" style="font-size:90%"| "—" denotes items that did not chart or were not released in that territory.
|}

As featured artist

Other appearances
Soundtracks

Others

Music videos

Other projects
 Recordings of Luther'', a group led by Luther Vandross.
 Vandross also guested as lead vocalist for the U.S./Italian ensemble Change.

Luther
Studio albums

Singles

Change
Studio albums

Singles

References

Discographies of American artists
Rhythm and blues discographies
discography
Soul music discographies